Mario Schifano (20 September 1934, Khoms, Libya – 26 January 1998, Rome, Italy) was an Italian painter and collagist of the Postmodern tradition. He also achieved some renown as a film-maker and rock musician.

He is considered to be one of the most significant and pre-eminent artists of Italian postmodernism. His work was exhibited in the famous 1962 "New Realists" show at the Sidney Janis Gallery with other young Pop art and Nouveau réalisme innovators, including Andy Warhol and Roy Lichtenstein. He became part of the core group of artists comprising the "Scuola di Piazza del Popolo" alongside Franco Angeli and Tano Festa. Renowned as a prolific and exuberant artist, he nonetheless struggled with a lifelong drug habit that earned him the label maledetto "cursed".

Schifano had a relationship with Anita Pallenberg in 1963, and with Marianne Faithfull in 1969.

He had a connection to The Rolling Stones beyond his relationships with Pallenberg and Faithfull. Keith Richards and Mick Jagger gave cameo performances in a film he directed, Umano, non umano (1969), and he was the inspiration for the Rolling Stones song "Monkey Man" on their 1969 album Let It Bleed.

Partial filmography
1964 - Round Trip (16 mm, B&W)
1964 - Reflex (16 mm, B&W, 8')
1966/1967 - Pittore a Milano (16 mm, B&W)
1967 - Serata (16 mm, C)
1967 - Anna Carini in agosto vista dalle farfalle (16 mm, C)
1967 - Vietnam (16 mm, B&W, mute, 3')
1967 - Made in USA (16 mm, B&W, mute)
1967 - Silenzio (16 mm, B&W, mute)
1967 - Jean-Luc Cinema Godard (16 mm, B&W)
1967 - Ferreri (16 mm, B&W, mute, 6')
1967 - Carol+Bill (16 mm, B&W, 31 min)
1967 - Souvenir (16 mm, B&W, 11')
1967 - Film (16 mm, B&W, 15')
1967 - Anna (16 mm, B&W, mute, 12')
1967 - Fotografo (16 mm, B&W, mute, 3')
1967 - Schifano (16 mm, B&W, mute, 1')
1967 - Voce della foresta di plastica (16 mm)
1968 - Satellite (film 1968)|Satellite (35 mm, B&W e C, 82')
1969 - Umano non umano (35 mm e 16 mm, C, 95' - (Production: Mount Street Film)
1969 - Trapianto, consunzione, morte di Franco Brocani (35 mm e 16 mm, C and B&W, 120')
1970 - Paesaggi (Super 8 mm, C)
1985 - Sigla per "La Magnifica Ossessione" (Video, C, 2' - Production RAI)
1994 - Absolut Vodka (Video, C, 20' - Directed with Roberto Lucca Taroni)

References

External links
 Biography of the artist Mario Schifano, at pontiart.com
 Evaluations parameters for Mario Schifano's artworks , at acquistoarte.it
 (IT) Exhibitions and Sales Market, at artemodernaitaliana.com

20th-century Italian painters
Italian male painters
Italian contemporary artists
Contemporary painters
Postmodern artists
Libyan people of Italian descent
Libyan emigrants to Italy
1998 deaths
1934 births
20th-century Italian male artists